Ali Nasuh Mahruki (born 21 May 1968) is a professional mountain climber, writer, photographer and documentary film producer. An all-round outdoor sportsman, he climbed to the summit of Mount Everest and was the first ever Turkish person to climb the Seven Summits.

Early life
He was born on 21 May 1968 in Istanbul. He is a fifth generation descendant of Admiral Nasuhzade Ali Pasha, commander of the Ottoman navy during Sultan Mahmud II.

After finishing high school at Şişli Terakki High School in Istanbul in 1987, Mahruki attended the School of Business Administration at Bilkent University in Ankara, and graduated in 1992. During his time at the university, he was introduced to mountain climbing in the university climbing club and later became club president.

Mountaineering career
Between 1992 and 1994, Mahruki climbed the five highest former Soviet mountains in Asia (Khan Tengri, Lenin Peak, Peak Korzhenevskaya, Communism Peak and Peak Pobeda), which are all over 7,000 metres high. This achievement gained him the honorific title "Snow Leopard", awarded by the Russian Climbing Federation.

Mahruki reached the summit of Mount Everest (8,848 m.) on 17 May 1995, being the first ever Turkish and Muslim person to do so. In 1996, he completed the climbing of Seven Summits in seven continents (Everest, Aconcagua, Vinson Massif, Kilimanjaro, McKinley, Elbrus and Kosciuszko).
 
In 1997, he climbed Cho Oyu solo, setting a Turkish record. He next ascended Lhotse without an oxygen tank in 1998 and climbed K2.

He is the president of AKUT, a voluntary search-and-rescue organization based in Istanbul he co-founded in 1996.

Mahruki has published four books and many articles about his outdoor challenges and travels all around the world.

Notable ascents
 Little Demirkazık (3,425 m) West face climb Niğde, Turkey  July 1991
  Five climbs on Terskey Ala Too mountains: Uglawaya (3,900 m), Peak Studentin (4,202 m), Brigandina-Albatros traverse (4,800-4,740 m), Cigid (5,170 m), Kazakhstan, July 1991
  First Turkish ascent of Khan Tengri (7,010 m), Kyrgyzstan, August 1992
  Great Demirkazık North Face climb (3,756 m), Niğde Turkey, September 1992
  Winter ascent of Mount Elbrus (5,621 m), Caucasus, February 1993
  Lenin Peak (7,134 m), Kyrgyzstan, July 1993
  First Turkish ascent of Vaja Psavela (6,912 m), Kyrgyzstan, August 1993
  First Turkish ascent of Peak of Four (6,299 m), Kyrgyzstan, July 1994
  First Turkish ascent of Peak Korzhenevskaya (7,105 m), Tajikistan, July 1994
  Peak Communism (7,495 m), Tajikistan, July 1994
  Solo and first Turkish ascent of Peak Pobeda (7,439 m), Kyrgyzstan, August 1994
  First Turkish winter ascent of Mount Damavand (5,610 m), Iran December 1994
  Mount Erciyes (3,916 m), North icefall winter ascent, Kayseri, February 1995
  Completed the "Seven Summits" project of climbing the highest peaks of each of the continents, in November 1996. The mountains are:
 Mt. Everest (8,848 m), Tibet, Asia, 17 May 1995. First Turkish ascent
 Aconcagua (6,959 m), Argentina, South America, November 1995. First Turkish ascent
 Vinson Massif (4,897 m), Antarctica, December 1995. First Turkish ascent
 McKinley (6,194 m), Alaska, North America, January 1996 First Turkish ascent
 Kilimanjaro (5,895 m), Tanzania, Africa, August 1996
 Elbrus (5,642 m) Caucasus, Europe, August 1996
 Cosciusko (2,228 m) Australia, November 1996
  Great Demirkazık (3,756 m), Peck route first winter ascent, Niğde, Turkey, December 1996.
  Güzeller (3,461 m), North face first winter ascent, Niğde, Turkey, February 1997.
  Solo ascent of Cho Oyu (8,201 m), Tibet, 6th highest mountain of the world. The highest solo ascent of Turkey. September 1997, without oxygen. First Turkish ascent
  Lhotse (8,516 m), 4th highest mountain of the world. West face, Nepal, May 1998, The highest oxygenless ascent of Turkey. First Turkish ascent
  Attempted Manaslu (8,163 m), Nepal October 1998.
  Mount Damavand (5,610 m), Iran January 2000
  Winter ascent of Mount Ararat (Ağrı Dağı) (5,137 m), Turkey February 2000
  First Turkish ascent of extremely dangerous and difficult K2 (8,611 m), Pakistan July 2000. 2nd the highest mountain in the world, The highest oxygenless ascent by a Turkish national.
  Muztagh Ata (7,546 m), China August 2001. First Turkish ascent. Highest ski-ascent of Turkey.

Books
 Diary of an Alpinist (Yapi Kredi Press, 1995)
 First Turk on Everest (Yapi Kredi Press, 1995)
 In Search of a Dream (Yapi Kredi Press, 1996)
 Roads of Asia, Himalayas, and Beyond (Yapi Kredi Press, 1999)
 Earth Diary (KAPITAL Press, 2002)
 Motherland is only to be loved by actions, not by empty words (GUNCEL YAYINCILIK, 2007)

Awards
 "Best Climber of Turkey" and was nominated as a candidate for the "Best Sportsman of Turkey", 1992 and 1994. (No elections in 1993)
 "Snow Leopard" by the Russian Mountaineering Federation after completing the ascents of 5 seven thousand meter peaks of the CIS, August 1994. At that time there were overall 214 climbers who were awarded with that title of which 3 were Western climbers.
 Ashoka Fellow with Ashoka Turkey since 2004

References

1968 births
Living people
Sportspeople from Istanbul
Turkish mountain climbers
Turkish summiters of Mount Everest
Summiters of the Seven Summits
Turkish non-fiction writers
Turkish photographers
Bilkent University alumni
Chairpersons of non-governmental organizations
Mount Ararat
Film people from Istanbul
Ashoka Fellows